Scott Russell Haskin (born September 19, 1970) is an American former professional basketball player who was selected by the Indiana Pacers in the first round (14th pick overall) of the 1993 NBA draft. Haskin played one season in the National Basketball Association (NBA) for the Pacers, appearing in 27 games and averaging 2.0 ppg. He played collegiately at Oregon State University.

External links
Basketball reference.com page

1970 births
Living people
American men's basketball players
Basketball players from Riverside, California
Centers (basketball)
Indiana Pacers draft picks
Indiana Pacers players
Oregon State Beavers men's basketball players
Power forwards (basketball)